Karl Thorsteins (born October 13, 1964) is an Icelandic chess player who has been an International Master since 1985. He won the Icelandic Chess Championship twice: in 1985 and 1989. In 1988, he played in the Reykjavik Invitational Tournament, finishing in tenth with a total of 5 points. A game he lost to Jóhann Hjartarson in this tournament was highlighted by Robert Byrne in the New York Times.

References

External links

Living people
1964 births
Icelandic chess players
Chess International Masters